The Philippines national rugby league team (nicknamed the Tamaraws) represent the Philippines in international rugby league football matches. They were established in 2011. In their short history the Tamaraws have been relatively successful, being repeated Asian Cup winners and regularly participating in the Cabramatta International 9s rugby league tournament.

History

The Philippines National Rugby League (PNRL) was established in 2011 with a view of expanding rugby league further into Asia. The PNRL oversees the running of the national team, in 2011 it was announced that the Philippines would be playing their first game of rugby league at the 2012 at the Cabramatta International Nines, while also being involved in other organized international rugby league tournaments in the Asia-Pacific region.

The Philippines have twice been involved in the Cabramatta International 9s rugby league tournament, in 2012 they defeated Burwood-North Ryde 22-18 to take the Bowl Trophy. In 2013 they selected 3 teams to take part in the tournament. and in 2014 four teams: the first side, two development sides, and an under 20s side.

In 2012 the Philippines won over Thailand at the 2012 Rugby League Asian Cup. The match was the first rugby league international played in Asia.

They entered the Emerging Nations World Championship in 2018 participating in the third edition of the tournament hosted in Australia. Arwin Marcus was named head coach for the tournament.

Competitive record

World Cup

Emerging Nations World Championship

Asian Cup

The Philippines made their international rugby league debut in Bangkok on October 21, 2012, with a match against Thailand, who were also making their international debut. Aided by a host of Australian-based players, Philippines won the match 86-0 in the first Rugby League Asian Cup.

Current squad
Squad selected for the 2021 Magellan Cup:

Richie Goodwin
Jhun Cortez
Ned Stephenson
Dennis Gordon
Thomas Cartwright
Gerald Reyes
Marc Russell
Glenn Powers
Paul Sheedy
Dylan Jones
Jeremy Grooms
Ryan Jones
Rez Phillips
Tyrone Tootell
Jacob Godfrey
Chris Murphy
Kingsley Leabres

International results
Philippines def. Thailand 86–0 (October 21, 2012)
Philippines def. Thailand 44–10 (October 21, 2013)
Niue def. Philippines 36–22 (October 4, 2014)
Philippines def. Vanuatu 32–16 (October 11, 2014)
Philippines def. Serbia 18–12 (February 5, 2016)
Malta def. Philippines 44–26 (February 4, 2017)
Philippines def. Hungary 72–0 (November 5, 2017)
Philippines def. Thailand 64–2 (November 8, 2017)
Hungary def. Philippines 30–12 (February 3, 2018)
Malta def. Philippines 36–10 (October 1, 2018)
Niue def. Philippines 24–12 (October 7, 2018)
Philippines def. Turkey 29–16 (October 10, 2018)

All-time Results Record

Coaches
 Clayton Watene (2012–2014)
 Arwin Marcus (2016–2021)
 Paul Sheedy/Marc Russell (2021–)

See also

References

External links
Philippine National Rugby League Official Website

Rugby league
National rugby league teams
Rugby league in the Philippines